Kotono (written 琴乃) is a feminine Japanese given name. Notable people with the name include:

, Japanese voice actress and narrator
, Japanese actress and singer
, Japanese rhythmic gymnast

Fictional characters
 Kotono Hayama in Saint October
 Kotono in Tuff E Nuff (Dead Dance)

Japanese feminine given names